Abrostola abrostolina is a moth of the family Noctuidae. It is found in Japan and Korea.

The wingspan is 25–27 mm.

External links
Japanese Moths

Plusiinae
Moths of Japan
Moths of Korea
Moths described in 1879